The Venetzueler Vochnblat (in Yiddish ווענעזועלער וואכנבלאט; in Spanish Semanario Venezolano, Venezuelan Weekly) was a newspaper founded by Abraham Stempel (who years later founded Prensa Israelita) in Caracas, Venezuela, in 1959. It was a tri-lingual paper, being published in Yiddish, Hebrew and Spanish. Originally it was published weekly but two years after its beginning was changed into a monthly newspaper, until 1964  when it was closed.

References

Ashkenazi Jewish culture in Venezuela
Hebrew-language newspapers
Yiddish newspapers
Spanish-language newspapers
Jews and Judaism in Venezuela
Bilingual newspapers
Yiddish culture in South America